The 1994 All-Ireland Senior Football Championship Final was the 107th All-Ireland Final and the deciding match of the 1994 All-Ireland Senior Football Championship, an inter-county Gaelic football tournament for the top teams in Ireland.

James McCartan Jr. scored the winning goal to complete an unprecedented Ulster four-in-a-row, and to extend Down's unbeaten final record to five wins out of five. Down maintained this remarkable record in All-Ireland finals until their sixth appearance in 2010, when Cork defeated them by a score of 0-16 to 0-15.

Down's second All-Ireland football title of the decade following their success in 1991, they were joint "team of the decade" for the 1990s with Meath who won two titles in 1996 and 1999.

This was the last occasion on which a team from Ulster won an All-Ireland SFC until Armagh won the 2002 All-Ireland Senior Football Championship Final.

References

All-Ireland Senior Football Championship Finals
All-Ireland Senior Football Championship Final
All-Ireland Senior Football Championship Final, 1994
All-Ireland Senior Football Championship Finals
All-Ireland Senior Football Championship Finals
Down county football team matches
Dublin county football team matches